George Grant (11 October 1924 – 27 March 1984) was a Labour politician in the United Kingdom and Member of Parliament for Morpeth in Northumberland from 1970 until 1983.

Prior to his election to Parliament, he had served for eleven years as a member of Bedlingtonshire Council. He was also Chairman of the Ashington branch of the National Union of Mineworkers from 1963 to 1970. In the House of Commons, he served as the Parliamentary Private Secretary to the Minister of Agriculture from 1974 to 1976.

References

External links 
 

1924 births
1984 deaths
Labour Party (UK) MPs for English constituencies
National Union of Mineworkers-sponsored MPs
UK MPs 1970–1974
UK MPs 1974
UK MPs 1974–1979
UK MPs 1979–1983
British trade unionists